Sarcochilus falcatus, commonly known as the orange blossom orchid, is a small epiphytic or lithophytic orchid that is endemic to eastern Australia. It has up to eight, leathery leaves with fine teeth on the edges and up to twelve white to cream-coloured flowers with a white labellum that has orange and purple markings.

Description
Flowering occurs between June and October.

Taxonomy and naming
Sarcochilus falcatus was first formally described in 1810 by Robert Brown who published the description in Prodromus Florae Novae Hollandiae et Insulae Van Diemen. It was the first species of Sarcochilus to be described and is therefore the type species. The specific epithet (falcatus) is a Latin word meaning "sickle-shaped" or "curved", referring to the shape of the leaves.

Distribution and habitat
The orange blossom orchid grows on trees but sometimes on rocks, usually in places exposed to air movement, clouds and drizzly weather.  It grows in the Cedar Bay National Park in Queensland and south to the coast and nearby tablelands of New South Wales. It rarely occurs in the far north-eastern corner of Victoria.

Ecology
A species of Ceratobasidium was isolated from a specimen of S. falcatus collected near Dungog.

Conservation
This orchid is classed as "endangered" in Victoria under the Victorian Government Flora and Fauna Guarantee Act 1988. It is classified as "least concern" (LC) by the IUCN Red List of Threatened Species.

References

External links

falcatus
Endemic orchids of Australia
Orchids of New South Wales
Orchids of Queensland
Orchids of Victoria (Australia)
Plants described in 1810
Epiphytic orchids
Lithophytic orchids